Below is a list of all the Dad's Army DVD and video releases so far. Included are the region 2 release dates, and the episodes that were released.

Video releases

BBC The Very Best releases

BBC episode releases

Britannia Music Company releases
Britannia Music Company Ltd have released all the episodes of Dad's Army in 23 volumes, with the exception of series one and two.

DVD releases

BBC DVD releases
The BBC released two "Best of" DVD sets in October 2001 and September 2002, but it wasn't until September 2004 that the full series began to be released, with the first series and the surviving episodes of the second series being released first, along with the documentary Missing Presumed Wiped. As of May 2007, nine series have been released, as well as the Christmas specials and various other sketches. The DVDs also include short individual biographical documentaries about the characters and their actors called We Are The Boys, comprising material directed by Kevin Davies on the set of the BBC's Britain's Best Sitcom competition. A full boxset is also available, containing all of the DVD releases except the two "Best of" compilations. These "Best of" collections were licensed by BFS Entertainment for a region 1 release under a single title of The Dad's Army collection in 2000.

In Australia, The entire Series has been released from 2004 – 2008.
The Best of Dad's Army – 2004
The Best of Dad's Army Vol.2 – 2004
The Complete First Series Plus The Lost Episodes From Series Two – 10 November 2004
The Complete Third Series – 3 August 2005
The Complete Fourth Series – October/November 2005
The Complete Fifth Series – 18 August 2006
The Complete Sixth Series – 5 October 2006
The Complete Seventh Series – March 2007
The Complete Eighth Series – 31 July 2007
The Christmas Specials – 7 November 2007
The Complete Ninth Series – 6 March 2008
The Complete Series – 6 August 2008
Series One: Eps 1-3 (Comedy Bites) – 4 March 2010
The Complete Collection – 5 August 2010

Other DVD releases
In addition to the series, there have been two feature films based on Dad's Army produced, as well as a docudrama production, and re-stagings of the three missing episodes, all of which have received DVD releases.

Region 1 DVD releases
On 24 October 2000 BFS Entertainment released a R1 collection of episodes called "Dad's Army Collection", which contains the following episodes on a 3 disc DVD boxset.

The Day The Balloon Went Up – Sons of the Sea – Don't Forget The Diver – Asleep in the Deep – Boots Boots Boots – A Soldier's Farewell – Big Guns – Menace From The Deep – The Bullet Is Not For Firing – Mum's Army – The Armoured Might of Lance Corporal Jones – Put That Light Out – The Two and a Half Feathers – The Test – Fallen Idol – The Deadly Attachment – If The Cap Fits – The Honourable Man

Dad's Army
Lists of home video releases